Peru State College (Peru) is a public college in Peru, Nebraska. Founded by members of the Methodist Episcopal Church in 1865, making it the first and oldest institution of higher education in Nebraska, it underwent several name changes before receiving its current name.

The college is organized into three schools, each supporting a different set of majors, including a graduate program, plus an extensive online education program that is credited with the college's most recent successes.

History
Peru State College was originally incorporated under the name Mount Vernon School (sometimes reported as Mount Vernon Seminary or Mount Vernon College) on December 2, 1865, under the management of the Methodist Episcopal Church, after the need for a local institution was discussed November 11, 1865. The school was named after the community in which it was located, on a bluff above the Missouri.  The town of Mount Vernon was supplanted by a community located at the base of the hill, whose original settlers came from Peru, Illinois.  The Nebraska Territorial Legislature chartered the school on February 12, 1866, under the name Peru Seminary and College.

The executive committee of the school deeded the grounds to the State of Nebraska in June 1867, making it the first state-supported college in Nebraska on June 20, 1867, with the first classes held on October 24, 1867.  The name was also changed to Nebraska State Normal School. This is also considered the official date of the school's establishment.

The name changed several times in the early to mid 20th century, becoming Nebraska State Teachers College at Peru in 1921, in 1949 Peru State Teachers College, and then the present name of Peru State College in 1963.

During World War II, the Peru campus of the Nebraska State Teachers College hosted a unit of the US Navy V-12 officer training program, which served as an alternative military route for college students who were drafted during the war.

The State of Nebraska established the Nebraska State College System by statute in 1978, and Peru State College was placed by statute under the control of the new governmental body at the same time.

In 1998 the Nebraska State College System evaluated the possibility of closing Peru State College, or moving its campus to another location, among other options, and voted unanimously in 1999 to move Peru State to nearby Nebraska City, Nebraska. However, the legislature concluded that moving the college would have been too costly, and lawmakers decided instead to pump millions of dollars into campus renovations with the understanding the college would work quickly to boost growth.

In 1999 the Nebraska Unicameral Legislature introduced bill LB631, aimed at merging Chadron State College and Wayne State College into the University of Nebraska system, while turning Peru State College into a community college. A competing bill, LB650, was introduced about the same time but with the intent of funding Peru State College $7 million for renovations.

In 2003 rumors spread again about the possibility of closing Peru State College as part of a set of proposals to help save money in the Nebraska education system.

Peru State College has been pushing forward, and in 2007 celebrated a record 472 graduates, with student enrollment ballooning even higher. Credit was given largely to its online education programs, which it was reported funded about 30 percent of campus initiatives. This period of growth has been referred to by one college administrator as "the Renaissance".

Campus

The names of several of the buildings reflect the campus's long history in Nebraska. The T.J. Majors Building, which houses the School of Education and School of Professional Studies, is named in honor of Lt. Col. Thomas Jefferson Majors.  The A.D. Majors building, which previously served as a residence hall, is named in honor of his nephew.  It was demolished in 2008. These are the only two buildings on campus bearing the name of a person who was never employed by the college. T.J. and A.D. Majors served on the state normal board.

In more recent years, Peru State College underwent massive renovations. These included renovations on the Eliza Morgan women's-only residence hall, providing for more modern amenities for residents. The buildings that previously served as the library and gymnasium were renovated and converted into a modernized library and an Academic Resource Center (ARC). The two buildings are also connected by a skywalk known as the "Bobcat Walk". The Al Wheeler Activity Center (AWAC) has also been renovated. Other renovations are still planned.

Academics
Three schools comprise Peru State College's academic offerings, providing baccalaureate and graduate degrees and certificates of achievement: School of Education, School of Arts and Sciences, and the School of Professional Studies. Peru State's small campus size provides for a small student-faculty ratio.

Arguably the largest academic program at Peru State College, and also its oldest, is the education department, under the School of Education. The original role of Peru State College was that of a normal school, training individuals to become the teachers in public and private elementary and secondary schools. Until the founding of the Nebraska State Normal School at Kearney, now known as the University of Nebraska at Kearney, it was the only normal school in Nebraska.

Peru's continued strong commitment to teacher education is also reflected in its accreditations and memberships. Peru State College receives accreditation from the National Council for Accreditation of Teacher Education (NCATE) and is a member of the National Council for Teacher Education and the American Association of Colleges for Teacher Education.

The School of Professional Studies houses Peru's Business Administration, Criminal Justice, and Psychology programs. The business administration curriculum is further broken down into accounting, computer and management information systems (CMIS), marketing, and human performance and systems management. An endorsement is also available for education majors wishing to teach business courses in secondary schools. The criminal justice program is further broken down into justice administration and justice counseling.

The School of Arts and Sciences provides Peru's arts and sciences majors: Art, Music, English, Social Sciences, Natural Science, Mathematics, and Liberal Arts. Education endorsements are provided for education majors as well.

Graduate programs offered are the Master of Science in Education - Curriculum and Instruction and the Master of Science in Organizational Management - Entrepreneurial and Economic Development. Additionally, graduate certificates in Education are offered in Classroom Behavior Management (CBM), Instructional Practices and Policy (IPP), Instructional Master (IM), and Instructional Technology (IT). One graduate certificate is offered in Organizational Development.

Athletics
The Peru State athletic teams are called the Bobcats. The college is a member of the National Association of Intercollegiate Athletics (NAIA), primarily competing in the Heart of America Athletic Conference (HAAC) since the 2011–12 academic year. The Bobcats previously competed in the defunct Midlands Collegiate Athletic Conference (MCAC) from 2000–01 to 2010–11.

Peru State competes in 13 intercollegiate varsity sports: Men's sports include baseball, basketball, bowling, cross country and football; while women's sports include basketball, bowling, cross country, golf, softball and volleyball; and co-ed sports include competitive cheer and competitive dance.

Intramurals
The college also offers on-campus intramural athletics for student participation. Individual and team competitions are available for meets, leagues, and tournaments.

Football
The Peru State football team won the 1990 NAIA Division II National Championship, defeating Westminster (Pa.) 17–7.  Tom Shea was named the 1990 NAIA Division II Coach of the Year.  The football team competes on the Oak Bowl field, which was completed in 1901.

Student life
Peru State College features many modern facilities and accommodations around campus, along with a variety of student organizations, which can be found in the Peru State College student handbook. The college does not have any fraternities or sororities.

Student government
The Student Senate is the representative body for Peru State College students. Twenty-four (24) students comprise the Senate, with all positions eligible for election annually. The student representative to the Nebraska Board of Trustees is also considered a member of the Student Senate.

Many campus activities are arranged and funded by the student-run Campus Activities Board, or CAB as it is known by Peru State College students. CAB is funded through the activity fee paid by all students. The Student Activities Coordinator is CAB's advisor and regularly reports to the Student Senate.

Residence life

Peru State College provides two single-sex residence halls: Eliza C. Morgan Hall for women only, and W.N. Delzell Hall for men only. There is also a three-building co-educational residence hall complex called the Centennial Complex. Each building of the Centennial Complex is actually two residence halls: Nicholas and Pate, Mathews and Clayburn, Davidson and Palmer. Each building elects one representative to the Student Senate.

The Mathews building is reserved for freshman students and upper class mentors participating in the Freshmen Fusion Program, and Nicholas and Pate are reserved for participants in the Leadership Living-Learning Community. W.N. Delzell Hall features the newly formed (2014) Community of Outdoor Adventure and Learning, and Eliza C. Morgan Hall has the Wellness Community for residents to participate in.

Campus media

The Peru State Times is Peru State College's student newspaper, previously known as the Pedagogian, published five times per semester and funded by the publication fee paid by students and paid advertising.

Notable alumni
 Clair Armstrong Callan, U.S. Congressman for Nebraska
 Floyd Fithian, Commander in the U.S. Navy, U.S. Congressman for Indiana
 Robert Dinsmore Harrison, U.S. Congressman for Nebraska
 Melvin O. McLaughlin, U.S. Congressman for Nebraska
 Darrell Mudra, college football coach
 Edison Pettit, astronomer, namesake of two craters,  Pettit on the Moon and Pettit on Mars
 Orville Ralston, World War I flying ace
 Randy Reeves, former Under Secretary of Veterans Affairs for Memorial Affairs, Commander (ret.) in U.S. Navy
 Danny Shouse, professional basketball player
 Howard Smith, author of "Developing Executive Ability" and "How to Remember Names and Faces"

Notable faculty
 Richard Barrett Lowe – former Governor of Guam and Governor of American Samoa; former Dean of the school
 Henry H. Straight – 2nd president of the college and science professor.

References

External links
 
 Official athletics website

 
Educational institutions established in 1865
Nebraska State College System
Education in Nemaha County, Nebraska
Buildings and structures in Nemaha County, Nebraska
1865 establishments in Nebraska Territory
Liberal arts colleges in Nebraska
Public universities and colleges in Nebraska